Matilda is a 1996 American fantasy comedy film co-produced and directed by Danny DeVito from a screenplay by Nicholas Kazan and Robin Swicord, based on the 1988 novel of the same name by Roald Dahl. The film stars Mara Wilson as the title character with DeVito (who also served a dual role as the narrator), Rhea Perlman, Embeth Davidtz, and Pam Ferris in supporting roles. The plot centers on the titular child prodigy who develops psychokinetic abilities and uses them to deal with her disreputable family and the tyrannical principal of her school.

Matilda was released in the United States on August 2, 1996, by Sony Pictures Releasing. The film received positive reviews from critics, with praise being directed towards its faithfulness to the novel and DeVito's direction. However, the film was commercially unsuccessful, grossing $33.5 million in the United States on a $36 million budget.

Plot

Young genius Matilda Wormwood is neglected and mistreated by her used car salesman father Harry and stay-at-home mother Zinnia, and her older brother, Michael. Smart and independent, she finds solace in the fictional worlds of books at the public library. When Matilda's parents refuse to enroll her into school, she puts bleach in her father's hair tonic and glues his hat to his head. Harry catches Matilda reading Moby-Dick, rips it up, and forces her to watch game shows on television. Matilda becomes increasingly enraged until the television explodes.

Harry sells a car to Miss Agatha Trunchbull, the tyrannical principal of Crunchem Hall Elementary School, in exchange for admitting Matilda as a student. Upon her first day, Matilda meets Hortensia and warns her about the headmistress's ways and watches Ms. Trunchbull in horror as she swings a girl named Amanda Thripp around and hammer throw her over a field of flowers. Matilda's teacher, Miss Jennifer Honey, notices the ease with which Matilda answers middle school multiplication questions and requests Matilda be moved to a higher class, but Trunchbull refuses and proceeds to tell Miss Honey if she cannot handle Matilda herself, that Ms. Trunchbull would lock her in the chokey. The Wormwoods are not interested either and disrespectfully kick her out. Trunchbull has the whole school watch her forcing 
Bruce to eat an entire enormous chocolate cake. Matilda leads the junior and senior students in cheering Bruce to success, and Trunchbull gives them all five hours detention as a punishment. Matilda discovers her father is under surveillance by the FBI over his illegal dealings. Her parents refuse to believe her as Zinnia flirts with the two agents whom she believes are speedboat salesmen.

After discovering the car Mr. Wormwood sold her was faulty, Trunchbull locks Matilda in 'the Chokey', a small cramped cupboard resembling an iron maiden, as punishment. While she waits to be let out, her friend Lavender puts a newt in Trunchbull's water jug. Trunchbull accuses Matilda, who, in anger at the injustice, mysteriously
tips the glass over, splashing the newt onto Trunchbull. Matilda is unable to reproduce her powers to Miss Honey during a test. Miss Honey invites Matilda to tea after school and lets her in on a secret: her mother died when she was two, and her father Magnus invited his wife's stepsister, Trunchbull, to live with them and look after her, but Trunchbull abused her. Magnus died, apparently by suicide, three years later, supposedly leaving everything in his will to Trunchbull, who Honey suspects murdered him. Matilda and Miss Honey sneak into Trunchbull's house to retrieve some of Honey's belongings, but narrowly escape when Trunchbull unexpectedly returns early.

Matilda practices her telekinetic powers and thwarts the FBI agents to buy Harry time to come to his senses. She returns to Trunchbull's house and attempts to scare her out of it but Trunchbull becomes aware of Matilda's visiting upon finding her red hair ribbon in her garden. The next day, Matilda reveals her powers to Miss Honey but Trunchbull visits the class to make Matilda confess. Matilda telekinetically writes a message on the blackboard, posing as the vengeful spirit of Magnus (whom Trunchbull thought was haunting her house) who accuses Trunchbull of murdering him. Trunchbull becomes hysterical and begins to attack the students, but Matilda protects them and the student body, both junior and senior, throw lunches at her as she is ran out the school for good. Miss Honey moves back into her house.

Later, the family arrive at Miss Honey's house to take Matilda with them and flee to Guam. Matilda refuses to go, saying she would rather be adopted by Miss Honey. Her parents are initially reluctant but her mother apologises for never understanding her only daughter. Desperate to leave, the parents sign the adoption papers and Matilda lives happily with Miss Honey, who becomes the principal.

Cast

Mara Wilson as Matilda Wormwood; a young, savvy, well-mannered, intelligent 6-year-old girl whose powers can make anything possible, Miss Honey's adoptive daughter.
Alissa and Amanda Graham/James and Trevor Gallagher as Newborn Matilda Wormwood
Kayla and Kelsey Fredericks as 9-month-old Matilda Wormwood
Amanda and Caitlin Fein as Toddler Matilda Wormwood
Sara Magdalin as 4-year-old Matilda Wormwood
Wilson also narrated the film in the extended cut version.
Embeth Davidtz as Jennifer Honey; the kind and devoted teacher at Crunchem Hall who inspires Matilda to believe in the power of what is inside, Matilda's adoptive mother.
Amanda and Kristin Summers as 2-year-old Jennifer Honey
Phoebe Pearl as 5-year-old Jennifer Honey
Pam Ferris as Agatha Trunchbull; Jennifer Honey's abusive aunt and also the cruel, and selfish principal at Crunchem Hall; she is a former Olympian athlete, and uses her strengths - shot put, hammer throw, and javelin - to hurt the children at the school. She also likes putting them in the Chokey, a small closet similar to an iron maiden with many nails sticking in it and broken glass shards.
Danny DeVito as Harry Wormwood; Zinnia's husband, Matilda and Michael's father, and a grumpy, hateful and abusive crooked car salesman.
DeVito also narrated the film in the theatrical cut version.
Rhea Perlman as Zinnia Wormwood; Harry's wife, Matilda and Michael's neglectful and selfish mother, and a vain and cheery bingo-obsessed parent.
Paul Reubens and Tracey Walter as Bob and Bill; two FBI agents posing as speedboat salesmen who are investigating Harry due to his illegal car business.
Brian Levinson as Michael Wormwood; Harry and Zinnia's bratty son and Matilda's older brother, who bullies, throws food at, and calls her "dip-face".
Nicholas Cox as 6-year-old Michael Wormwood
Kiami Davael as Lavender; Matilda's best friend and fellow classmate.
Jacqueline Steiger as Amanda Thripp; Matilda's timid classmate who has pigtails which Miss Trunchbull hates.
Jimmy Karz as Bruce Bogtrotter; Matilda's gluttonous senior classmate who gets abused by Miss Trunchbull for eating her chocolate cake.
Kira Spencer Hesser as Hortensia; an older schoolmate who warns Matilda about the Trunchbull.
Jean Speegle Howard as Mrs. Phelps; the librarian who gives books to Matilda and is fascinated by and encourages her love of reading.
Marion Dugan as Cookie; the elderly school cook who makes chocolate cake and is loyal to Miss Trunchbull.
Jon Lovitz as Mickey, the host of a vapid game show called Sticky with Mickey.

Production
In November 1993, it was announced that Universal Pictures had won a screen adaptation of Matilda by Roald Dahl written by writers Nicholas Kazan and Robin Swicord following a heated bidding war between Universal and Columbia Pictures. Following disagreements between Danny Devito and Bregman-Baer Productions over budgetary concerns, Universal put Matilda into turnaround with Columbia's TriStar Pictures picking up the project.

Miriam Margolyes confirmed that she auditioned for the role of Agatha Trunchbull during a filmed interview with Jo Brand for the UK television special Roald Dahl's Revolting Rule Book which was hosted by Richard E. Grant and aired on September 22, 2007. This documentary commemorated Dahl's 90th birthday and also celebrated his impact as a children's author in popular culture. Margolyes went on to play Aunt Sponge (another Dahl villainess) as well as the voice of the Glowworm in James and the Giant Peach which was also released in 1996.

Pam Ferris (Miss Trunchbull) incurred several injuries during the production on the film. The climactic scene where she is whacked by blackboard rubbers required her to keep her eyes open, causing chalk dust to get caught in her eyes and necessitating several trips to the hospital to get her eyes washed out. The scene where Trunchbull whirls Amanda Thripp (Jacqueline Steiger) by her pigtails required a harness to support the little girl, the wires of which were threaded through the pigtails and then looped around Ferris's fingertips to give her grip. As she swung her around, the centrifugal force grew too great and tore the top part of Ferris' finger, requiring seven or eight stitches.

The Crank House, in Altadena, stood in for Miss Trunchbull's house. The exterior of Matilda's house is located on Youngwood Drive in Whittier, while the library she visits is the Pasadena Public Library on East Walnut Street in Pasadena.

On March 10, 1995, Mara Wilson's mother, Suzie Wilson, was diagnosed with breast cancer during filming and later died on April 26, 1996, four months before the film’s release. The film was dedicated to her memory. Danny DeVito revealed that prior to her death, he had shown her the final edit of the movie so that she was able to see Wilson’s performance in the movie.

Music
Two songs are featured in the film. One of them, "Send Me on My Way" by Rusted Root, is played twice: when four-year-old Matilda is left alone at her house, making pancakes, and at the end of the film, set to a montage of Matilda and Miss Honey playing at Miss Trunchbull's former house. The other song is Thurston Harris' "Little Bitty Pretty One", played when Matilda is learning to control her telekinetic powers. The film's original score was composed by David Newman, a frequent collaborator of DeVito.

Release
The film was released on August 2, 1996, and grossed $33.5 million in the United States against a production budget of $36 million.

Home media
The film was released on VHS in pan and scan and LaserDisc in widescreen on December 17, 1996, from Columbia TriStar Home Video. In 1997, it was released on a bare-bones dual sided DVD containing fullscreen and widescreen. Another DVD rendition with more special features was released in 2005. In August 2013, Wilson and most of her costars from the film had a reunion to celebrate its 17th anniversary and it being released on Blu-ray. The reunion was featured in the Blu-ray release.

Reception
On Rotten Tomatoes, Matilda has an approval rating of 91% based on 22 reviews, with an average rating of 7.6/10. The website's critical consensus read, "Danny DeVito-directed version of Matilda is odd, charming, and while the movie diverges from Roald Dahl, it nonetheless captures the book's spirit." On Metacritic, the film has a score of 72 out of 100 based on reviews from 21 critics, indicating "generally favorable reviews." Audiences surveyed by CinemaScore gave the film a grade "B+" on scale of A to F. Writing for Empire, Caroline Westbrook gave the film a rating of three stars and praised DeVito's clever direction.

Roger Ebert of Chicago Sun-Times praised the film's oddity, gave it three stars out of four and wrote:

Potential sequel
In November 2019, DeVito said that he "always wanted to" develop a sequel to Matilda, adding that a potential sequel could star Matilda's own child, due to Wilson having grown up after the film's release.

References

External links

Matilda at Moviechat 

Film
1996 films
1990s English-language films
1990s children's fantasy films
1990s fantasy comedy films
1990s children's comedy films
American children's fantasy films
American children's comedy films
American fantasy comedy films
American films about revenge
Films about educators
Films about children
Films about friendship
Films about bullying
Films about child abuse
Films about dysfunctional families
Films about teacher–student relationships
Films about telekinesis
Films based on children's books
Films based on works by Roald Dahl
Films directed by Danny DeVito
Films produced by Danny DeVito
Films scored by David Newman
Films set in California
Films set in schools
Films shot in California
Films with screenplays by Robin Swicord
TriStar Pictures films
1996 comedy films
1990s American films